Gnaeus Gellius ( half of 2nd centuryBC) was a Roman historian. Very little is known about his life and work, which has only survived in scattered fragments. He continued the historical tradition set by Fabius Pictor of writing a year-by-year history of Rome from mythological times to his day. However, with about a hundred books, Gellius' Annales were massively more developed than the other Roman annalists, and was only surpassed by Livy's gigantic History of Rome.

Life
Gnaeus Gellius belonged to the plebeian gens Gellia. The gens was probably of Samnite origin as two generals of the Second and Third Samnite wars bore this name (Statius Gellius and Gellius Egnatius). Some of its members later moved to Rome, perhaps not long before the historian was born, since only one Roman named Gellius is known before him—likely his father, likewise with the name Gnaeus.  The historian's father was opposed in court to a man named Lucius Turius, who was defended by Cato the Censor.  Several scholars have however considered that the historian was the same as Cato's opponent, but this view seems now abandoned.

Gellius' only known magistracy was that of triumvir monetalis in 138, during which he minted denarii and bronze fractions (semis, triens, and quadrans).  This denarius features on the reverse a quadriga led by Mars with a character beside him, which was initially thought to be Nerio—a goddess of Sabine origin that was the partner of Mars—but this view has been rejected by Michael Crawford and later historians, who argue the second character is only a captive.  The confusion arose from the fact that most of the knowledge on Nerio comes precisely from a rare fragment of Gellius' Annales.

Several modern historians have postulated that Gellius belonged to the Populares, the reformist faction during the last century of the Republic, because he was used by Licinius Macer, another Popularis historian, and his writing appears to favour the plebeians. He also detailed several legends on other Italian peoples, whom the Populares wanted to grant the Roman citizenship at the time of Gellius. Moreover, several Gellii are known for the 1st century BC; they took the cognomen Poplicola ("of the people"), which could reveal a link with the Populares.  Evidences have nevertheless been judged too thin by later scholars; John Briscoe does not even discuss this theory.

Work

Date 
Gellius followed the standard established by Fabius Pictor—the first Roman historian—of writing a chronological history of Rome from mythological times to the present. Although Pictor wrote his book in Greek, Roman historians switched to Latin after Cato published his Origines in that language at the end of his life (in the 150s).

The date of composition is uncertain. Modern historians have ordered the Roman annalists after two enumerations by Cicero, who put Gellius' Annales after those of Lucius Calpurnius Piso Frugi, Gaius Sempronius Tuditanus and Gaius Fannius C. f., but before Lucius Coelius Antipater's shorter history of the Second Punic War.  The latter possibly wrote his book circa 110. He or Piso were probably the first to give their work the title of Annales.

Size 
The most striking feature of Gellius' work is its huge size. Charisius indeed quotes a word from "book 97", which may not even be the last one of the Annales. This number was unprecedented in Roman historiography; for instance, Lucius Cassius Hemina wrote only five books, Piso about 8, and Tuditanus at least 13. Modern historians have consequently doubted that Gellius reached that number. Münzer thought that it was an invention of a later grammarian to boast about the extent of his reading. Others suggested that "97" is a corruption in the manuscript; Martine Chassignet corrected it as "book 27", Maixner, Beck and Walter as "book 47". Elizabeth Rawson notes that these numbers were still much higher than Gellius' predecessors. However, John Briscoe sees no reason to dismiss the initial number of books. He shows that while Livy tells all the events prior to the foundation of the Roman Republic in his first book, Gellius was still dealing with the Rape of the Sabines in his third book, whereas this event took place at the beginning of the reign of Romulus.  We also know that the events of 216 are described by Livy in his 23rd book, while Gellius had already reached book 33 by that time.  The number of 97 books is therefore consistent with Gellius' chronology; moreover, as with the other Roman historians, he probably spent more time telling about the events he witnessed.

It was first thought, especially by Ernst Badian, that Gellius could only have produced such quantity of books by including into his work the information contained in the Annales Maximi. These were a compilation of omens and religious events recorded from the earliest times by the pontifex maximus; they counted 80 volumes and were said to have been published by Publius Mucius Scaecola, pontifex maximus between 130 and 115—the years of Gellius' activity. This theory crumbled after a study published by Bruce Frier in 1979, who argued that the true date of the Annales Maximi's publication was under Augustus. Frier triggered a long debate among scholars, but they have agreed with him that their significance was not as crucial as Badian used to think, and the view that they were used by Gellius to fill his hundred books has been abandoned.  

Briscoe suggests instead that Gellius filled his books with invented speeches; significantly, the only long verbatim quote of Gellius' work is a speech of the Sabine Hersilia (and Romulus' wife) in the aftermath of the Rape of the Sabines. In addition, Gellius seems to have combined several legends to invent his own. For example, he said that King Numa had only one daughter, Pompilia, while the canonical view was that he had four sons. He also tells that Cacus seized a kingdom in Campania, whereas the standard story presents him as a brigand. He furthermore mentions a flood of the Fucine Lake that destroyed the otherwise unknown town of Archippe, but this Greek name is improbable for a town in central Italy and should be regarded as Gellius' invention, who was possibly inspired by a real flood which occurred in 137. As a result of these literary artifices, Gellius must be the Roman historian that vastly inflated the Roman historical narrative, since his predecessors' histories of Rome were much shorter, and his successors wrote longer works (though not as long as Gellius'). This process called "the expansion of the past" by Badian was concluded by Livy in his monumental History of Rome, which is also full of fictitious speeches and repetitive military campaigns.

Later use 
Gellius was later used as a source by Gaius Licinius Macer, a Popularis historian writing in the 70s BC. As with Gellius, Macer's work is lost, but he is cited three times alongside Gellius by Dionysios, a strong indication that Macer reproduced Gellius' work in his own Annales.  Dionysios is the only surviving historian with citations of Gellius (six), but he does not quote him verbatim. Dionysios cites Gellius four times to show that he disagreed with other writers (fragments 1, 21–23), and two times to criticise him for his carelessness (fragments 24 and 25). As Gellius especially developed the founding myths of the world, he was used five times by Pliny the Elder in his Natural History, principally about the inventions of writing, mining, weights and measures, etc. (fragments 12–16).

Nevertheless, the majority of the fragments of Gellius' work come from Latin grammarians of the Late Empire, such as Macrobius ( 5th century AD), Servius, or Charisius (both  4th century AD), who, with 11 fragments, was the author who cited Gellius the most. Moreover, the only verbatim quote of Gellius comes from Aulus Gellius, a grammarian and antiquarian of the 2nd century BC.

He was apparently both an accurate chronologer and a diligent investigator of ancient usages, respectfully cited by many later authorities. Regarding historical events themselves, his work was cited by Dionysius of Halicarnassus but largely ignored by Livy and Plutarch.

List of fragments

See also
 Annals & Annalists
 Roman historiography

References

Citations

Footnotes

Bibliography

Ancient sources 

 Marcus Tullius Cicero, De Divinatione, De Legibus''''.
Aulus Gellius, Attic Nights.
 Plutarch, Parallel lives.

Modern sources 

 Ernest Babelon, Description Historique et Chronologique des Monnaies de la République Romaine, Vulgairement Appelées Monnaies Consulaires, Paris, 1885.
Ernst Badian, "The Early Historians", in Thomas Allen Dorey, Latin Historians, New York, Basic Books, 1966, pp. 1–38.
 T. Robert S. Broughton, The Magistrates of the Roman Republic, American Philological Association, 1951–1952.
Martine Chassignet, L'Annalistique romaine. T. II : L'Annalistique Moyenne (Fragments), Paris, Les Belles Lettres, 1999.
——, "L'annaliste Cn. Gellius ou l'"heurématologie" au service de l'histoire", Ktèma, 24, 1999, pp. 85–91.
Tim Cornell (editor), The Fragments of the Roman Historians, Oxford University Press, 2013.
Bruce W. Frier, Libri Annales Pontificum Maximorum: The Origins of the Annalistic Tradition, Ann Arbor, University of Michigan Press, 1999 (first published in 1979).
August Pauly, Georg Wissowa, Friedrich Münzer, et alii, Realencyclopädie der Classischen Altertumswissenschaft (abbreviated RE), J. B. Metzler, Stuttgart, 1894–1980.
Hermann Peter, Historicorum Romanorum reliquiae, Leipzig, 1914.
Elizabeth Rawson, "The First Latin Annalists", Latomus, T. 35, Fasc. 4 (oct.-déc. 1976), pp. 689–717.
John Rich, "Fabius Pictor, Ennius and the Origins of Roman Annalistic Historiography", in Christopher Smith, Kaj Sandberg (editors), Omnium Annalium Monumenta: Historical Writing and Historical Evidence in Republican Rome, Leiden & Boston, Brill, 2017, pp. 17–65.
Edward Allen Sydenham, The Coinage of the Roman Republic, London, Spink, 1952.
G. J. Szemler, The Priests of the Roman Republic, A Study of Interactions, between Priesthoods and Magistracies, Bruxelles, Latomus, 1972.

2nd-century BC historians
2nd-century BC Romans
2nd-century BC writers
Latin historians
Gellii
Moneyers of ancient Rome